St. Joseph's Syro-Malabar Catholic Church is situated in Meenkunnam village, 6 km from Muvattupuzha, India. It was founded by Venerable Mar Varghese Payyappilly Palakkappilly in 1921. The church belongs to the Syro-Malabar Catholic Diocese of Kothamangalam.

History

Meenkunnam village has a large population of Syrian Catholics. These Nasrani Christians, who were previously under Marth Mariam Syro-Malabar Catholic Forane Church, Arakuzha, have more than 1500 years of recorded history.

A main landmark of Meenkunnam is a copy of Michelangelo's Pietà, which was created by the artist Appukuttan. This sculpture at Meenkunnam is roughly 4 times the size of the  original Pietà, located at the St. Peter's Basilica, Vatican City. Owing to its size, the artist could make a compromise on intricate details and created a sculpture lacking realism, ideal beauty, harmony and balance observed in the original sculpture which showcases a balance of Renaissance ideals of classical beauty with naturalism.

References

Syro-Malabar Catholic church buildings
Churches in Ernakulam district
1921 establishments in India
Christian organizations established in 1921
Eastern Catholic churches in Kerala
Churches completed in 1925